Dame Tu Amor is the second album release by the Mexican performer Alejandra Guzmán. It was released in 1989 and included eight cover versions of songs  from the 1960s and 1970s.

Track listing
 "No Seas Cruel" (Otis Blackwell, Elvis Presley)
 "Twist y Gritos"  (Phil Medley, Bert Russell)
 "Popotitos"   (Larry Williams)
 "La Casa del Sol Naciente" (Alan Price)
 "Soy Tuya mi Amor" (Ray Davies)
 "Diana" (Paul Anka)
 "Satisfacción" (Mick Jagger, Keith Richards)
 "Dame Tu Amor" (Steve Winwood, Spencer Davis, Muff Winwood)

Singles

Alejandra Guzmán albums
Spanish-language albums
1989 EPs